50th Birthday Celebration Volume 4 is a live album by Electric Masada documenting their performance at Tonic in September 2003 as part of John Zorn's month-long 50th Birthday Celebration.

Reception

The AllMusic review by Sean Westergaard states "This is a fantastic ensemble, with lots of time spent playing together, and Zorn knows how get the best out of them. Fans of the Masada series will not be disappointed. Excellent."

Track listing

Personnel
Cyro Baptista – percussion 
Joey Baron – drums 
Trevor Dunn – bass 
Ikue Mori – laptop electronics 
Marc Ribot – guitar 
Jamie Saft– keyboards 
Kenny Wollesen – drums 
John Zorn – alto saxophone

References

Albums produced by John Zorn
Masada (band) albums
John Zorn live albums
2004 live albums
Tzadik Records live albums